Canadian Niagara Power Inc. is an electricity transmission and distribution utility servicing Fort Erie and Port Colborne, Ontario. Founded in 1892 as the Canadian Niagara Power Company, it operated the Rankine Generating Station from 1905 to 2006.

Founded in Niagara Falls, Ontario by American William Birch Rankine, the company was acquired by Niagara Mohawk Power Corporation in 1950 and owned by Fortis Inc. since 2002. With the closure of Rankine GS in 2009, the company now focuses on power distribution and transmission network.

References

1892 establishments in Ontario
Electric power companies of Canada
Fortis Inc.
Companies based in Ontario
Fort Erie, Ontario
Port Colborne
Canadian companies established in 1892
Hydroelectric power companies of Canada